Gvido Birolla (12 June 1881 – 29 May 1963) was a Slovene painter, illustrator and caricaturist, known for his political caricatures published in satirical newspapers of the time and his book illustrations.

Birolla was born in Trieste in 1881. His father was an Italian from Pazin and his mother a Slovene from Škofja Loka. After his father's death in 1884, his mother moved back to Škofja Loka where Gvido grew up. He studied in Ljubljana and later at the Academy of Fine Arts in Vienna. He died in Ljubljana in 1963.

Birolla was a very popular book illustrator and won the Levstik Award for his illustrations of Karel Širok's book Trije bratje in trije razbojniki (Three Brothers and Three Robbers).

Selected illustrated works

 Leta moje mladosti (The Years of My  Youth), written by Fran Saleški Finžgar, 1967 (illustrated together with Ive Šubic
 Jurij Kozjak, slovenski janičar (Jurij Kozjak, the Slovene Janissary), written by Josip Jurčič, 1963 
 Repoštev, gospodar krkonošev, written by Johann Karl August Musäus, 1957
 Škorenjček Matevžek (Matevžek the Little Boot), written by Saša Vuga, 1955
 Brezen (The Abyss), written by Andrej Šavli, 1955
 Trije bratje in trije razbojniki (Three Brothers and Three Robbers), written by Karel Širok, 1951
 Triglav: planinska idila (Triglav: A Mountain Idyll), written by Fran Saleški Finžgar, 1950 
 Oljki (To the Olive Tree), written by Simon Gregorčič, 1944
 Mlada pota (Paths of Youth), written by Oton Župančič, 1921

References

Slovenian male painters
Slovenian illustrators
Slovenian caricaturists
1881 births
1963 deaths
Levstik Award laureates
Artists from Trieste
20th-century Slovenian painters
20th-century Slovenian male artists
Yugoslav painters